Proposition 31 is a California ballot proposition regarding the regulation and prohibition of flavored tobacco that appeared on the 2022 general elections.

A "yes" vote supports limiting the retail sale of flavored tobacco while a "no" vote opposes such limits.

Proposal 
The proposition is a referendum on a 2020 California law, Senate Bill 793, that seeks to ban the sale of most flavored tobacco products in stores and vending machines. Violations of the ban would result in fines of $250. Exemptions include hookah and loose-leaf tobacco.

Responses 
Supporters of the proposition include the California Teachers Association, the California Democratic Party, the Kaiser Foundation Health Plan, the American Cancer Society Cancer Action Network, Michael Bloomberg, and Gavin Newsom. Opponents of the proposition include the California Republican Party and tobacco companies including R. J. Reynolds Tobacco Company and Philip Morris USA.

Results

References 

2022 California ballot propositions